Pilot Mountain is a mountain located  northwest of the city limits of Prince George, British Columbia. The mountain top is used as a radio communications site by users including CKPG-TV channel 2.

References

Further reading 
 Mike Nash, Exploring Prince George: A Guide to North Central B. C. Outdoors, PP 38 – 39
 Caledonia Ramblers trail description

Mountains of British Columbia under 1000 metres
Cariboo Land District